Houston Stars was an American women's soccer team, founded in 2003. The team was a member of the Women's Premier Soccer League, the third tier of women’s soccer in the United States and Canada, until 2005, when the team left the league and the franchise was terminated.

Coached by Luis Labastida, the team joined the WPSL in 2003 in the provisional conference using the name the SWC Houston Stars.  In 2004, the league placed the team in the south division.  The Stars played their home games at Soccer World Center in Richmond, Texas.

Year-by-year

References

External links
 Women's Premier Soccer League Year by Year

   

Women's Premier Soccer League teams
Women's soccer clubs in the United States
Soccer clubs in Texas
S
2005 disestablishments in Texas
2003 establishments in Texas
Association football clubs established in 2003
Association football clubs disestablished in 2005
Women's sports in Texas